Craig Gazey (born 24 February 1982) is a British stage and television actor, best known for his portrayal of Graeme Proctor in the ITV soap Coronation Street.

Early life
Gazey attended Our Lady's Roman Catholic High School in Royton, Oldham. His family remain living in the surrounding area. He attended Eggbuckland Community College through until 1998, where he left to attend City College Plymouth, studying BTEC National Diploma in Performing Arts. After this, he went on to study acting at the Royal Welsh College of Music & Drama in Cardiff, which he graduated in 2005.

Career
Gazey made numerous stage appearances before gaining his TV break, notably in the role of Launcelot Gobbo in a Globe Theatre production of The Merchant of Venice in 2007.

Gazey joined the cast of the long-running ITV soap opera Coronation Street in April 2008, portraying the role of Graeme Proctor, a prison cellmate of established character David Platt. Despite only agreeing to a short-term contract, Gazey returned in November 2008, now as a series regular. Gazey went on to appear in the show for three years, and became popular with viewers, winning the "Best Newcomer" and "Best Comedy Performance" honours at the National Television Awards. During his time in the soap, Gazey made appearances on television as a guest on Loose Women and Celebrity Juice. He even appeared in character as Graeme in a special edition of The Jeremy Kyle Show, alongside fellow Coronation Street cast members Jack P. Shepherd, Michelle Keegan and Ben Price.

After leaving Coronation Street, he appeared at the Trafalgar Studios in the West End theatre play, Third Floor in October 2011. In 2012, he toured the United Kingdom in the comedy, Funny Peculiar alongside Suzanne Shaw and former Coronation Street co-star Vicky Entwistle. In 2013, he appeared in a stage version of The Full Monty at Sheffield, followed by a tour and a season in the West End in 2014. In October 2014, Gazey appeared in The Hypochondriac alongside Sir Tony Robinson and Imogen Stubbs at the Theatre Royal Bath, followed by a tour. In 2015, he took part in Celebrity Masterchef for the BBC.

Filmography

References

External links
 

Alumni of the Royal Welsh College of Music & Drama
People from Royton
Male actors from Oldham
1982 births
Living people
British male television actors